Dario Ivanovski (born May 1997) is a Macedonian long distance runner who runs for AK Delta Skopje and the Macedonian national team.

Running career
Ivanovski won the 3000 meters at a meet in Elbasan in 2016.

In 2017, he won the half marathon race that was part of the Skopje Marathon with a time of 1:11:26. On April 22, 2017, he won the Belgrade Half Marathon in a time of 1:10:00.

He also set the national record in the 3000 meters at a meet in Novi Sad.

Ivanovski competed in the 1500 metres at the 2018 IAAF World Indoor Championships. On April 21, 2018, he won the Belgrade Half Marathon for the second year in a row, this time recording a new personal best time of 1:08:03.

See also
List of Macedonian records in athletics

References

External links
1

1997 births
Macedonian male long-distance runners
Sportspeople from Skopje
Living people